Limont is a village and district of the municipality of Donceel, located in the province of Liège in Wallonia, Belgium.

The village has existed at least since the Middle Ages. A still extant keep, a fortified tower also known as Limont Castle, was erected in the village in the 13th century. A small château, built in the late 18th century and enlarged in the early 19th century, lies close to the centre of the village, surrounded by a park.

References

External links

Populated places in Liège Province